CommScope is an American network infrastructure provider based in Hickory, North Carolina. CommScope employs over 30,000 employees. The company joined the NASDAQ stock exchange on October 25, 2013.

CommScope designs and manufactures network infrastructure products. It has four business segments: home networks, broadband networks, venue and campus Networks, and outdoor wireless networks.

History 
CommScope was originally a product line of Superior Continental Cable, which was founded in 1953 in Hickory, North Carolina. In 1961, Superior created a division called Comm/Scope, which developed CATV systems and sold a coaxial cable named CommScope. In 1967, Superior was acquired by Continental Telephone Company, with CommScope becoming a division of Continental. In 1975, Frank Drendel headed a team charged with selling the product line. Drendel and Jearld Leonhardt founded CommScope in August 1976 after raising $5.1 million to purchase the CommScope product line. Two years later, CommScope and Valtech merged under the Valtech name. In 1979 Valtech donated fiber optics line and equipment to link the U.S. House of Representatives to the C-SPAN studios, enabling live broadcasting of U.S. Congressional proceedings for the first time.

In the 1980s, Valtech sold to M/A-COM. and CommScope became part of the Cable Home Group for M/A-COM. In 1983, CommScope formed the Network Cable division for the local area network, data communications, television-receive only, and specialized wire markets. In 1986 M/A-COM, sold the Cable Home Group to General Instrument Corporation, and CommScope became a division of General Instrument.

In 1997, General Instrument split into three independent, publicly traded companies, with its cable operation spun off as CommScope. At the time, CommScope had annual revenues of $560 million and was the largest provider of coaxial cable to cable TV operators.

In 2000, CommScope opened its new global headquarters in Hickory, North Carolina. In 2004, CommScope acquired Avaya's Connectivity Solutions cabling unit and inherited the SYSTIMAX brand, a company perhaps best known for its enterprise cabling systems. Avaya's Carrier Solutions, which offered products designed for switching and transmission applications in telephone central offices and secure environmental enclosures, also became part of CommScope. This acquisition doubled CommScope's size. In 2007, CommScope acquired the global wireless infrastructure provider Andrew Corporation, which would help CommScope meet demand from mobile phone companies.

In 2008, CommScope was chosen to provide the Dallas Cowboys with the connectivity for their new stadium starting with the 2009 NFL season, using over 5 million feet of copper and fiber-optic cabling.

In 2011, The Carlyle Group acquired CommScope. This acquisition made CommScope privately owned by The Carlyle Group and removed it from the New York Stock Exchange. Eddie Edwards was appointed president and chief executive officer, succeeding Frank Drendel, who had served as CommScope's CEO since the company's founding in 1976. Drendel continued as the chairman of the board.

On October 25, 2013, CommScope had its initial public offering on the NASDAQ, being listed as COMM.

In February 2016, it was announced that the Daytona International Speedway had a new wiring infrastructure from CommScope. In June 2016, CommScope was signed by the Carolina Panthers to upgrade the wireless and wired communications at the team's Bank of America Stadium.

In November 2016, the Carlyle Group announced the sale of its remaining shares of CommScope.

In 2019, for the Hong Kong-Zhuhai-Macao Bridge, a 55 kilometer bridge-tunnel system, CommScope supplied over 110 multiband antennas supporting 2G, 3G, and 4G network bands.

On April 4, 2019, CommScope completed the acquisition of Arris International, a telecommunications equipment manufacturing company and owner of Ruckus Networks. Both Arris and Ruckus were made brands of CommScope.

On October 1, 2020, CommScope announced that Charles Treadway would succeed Eddie Edwards as the company's new president and CEO. The company also announced that Bud Watts would replace Frank Drendel as chairman, with Drendel being named chairman emeritus.

In October 2020, CommScope  acquired the patent portfolio for virtual radio access networks (vRAN) from Phluido, a company specializing in RAN virtualization and disaggregation. 

On March 2, 2021, CommScope appointed company veteran Praveen Jonnala as chief information officer (CIO). Jonnala replaced Karen Renner, CommScope's senior vice president and CIO, who left the company in November. Jonnala was previously global vice president of digital transformation and business solutions. 

On April 8, 2021, CommScope announced its plan to spin-off its home networks business.

Acquisitions
In 2004, the company acquired Avaya's connectivity business, including the legacy intellectual property and patents from Western Electric, AT&T, Lucent Technologies, and Avaya.

In June 2007, CommScope acquired Andrew Corporation for $2.6 billion. Andrew's products included antennas, cables, amplifiers, repeaters, transceivers, as well as software and training for the broadband and cellular industries.

In 2015, CommScope acquired TE Connectivity's Broadband Network Solutions (BNS) division. Later in 2015 CommScope acquired Airvana, a privately held company specializing in small cell solutions for wireless networks.

References

External links

Telecommunications companies of the United States
Telecommunications companies established in 1976
Telecommunications equipment vendors
Computer companies of the United States
Electronics companies established in 1976
American companies established in 1976
Manufacturing companies based in North Carolina
Companies listed on the Nasdaq
1976 establishments in North Carolina
2013 initial public offerings
Hickory, North Carolina
Corporate spin-offs